Lyudmila Sergeyevna Kolchanova (born October 1, 1979, in Sharya, Kostroma Oblast) is a Russian long jumper.

Her personal best jump is 7.21 metres, achieved in May 2007 in Sochi.

International competitions

See also
List of World Athletics Championships medalists (women)
List of European Athletics Championships medalists (women)
List of medal sweeps at the World Athletics Championships

References

 

1979 births
Living people
Sportspeople from Kostroma Oblast
Russian female long jumpers
Olympic female long jumpers
Olympic athletes of Russia
Athletes (track and field) at the 2012 Summer Olympics
Universiade gold medalists in athletics (track and field)
Universiade gold medalists for Russia
Medalists at the 2005 Summer Universiade
World Athletics Championships athletes for Russia
World Athletics Championships medalists
IAAF Continental Cup winners
European Athletics Championships winners
European Athletics Championships medalists
Russian Athletics Championships winners